The Radcliffe School is a comprehensive school located in Wolverton, Milton Keynes, England.

The school offers General Certificates of Secondary Education (GCSEs), Business and Technology Education Council vocational qualifications (BTEC), Youth Awards and Entry Level Certificates as programmes of study for pupils. The Radcliffe School also operates a sixth form, with courses offered including A-Levels, BTECs and diplomas.

Students also have the option to take part in The Duke of Edinburgh's Award scheme.

House system

The four houses are named after notable local people, and each student (including 6th form) is put into one of those four houses upon enrolment into the school in Year 7. Each house is represented by a different colour and students wear a navy blue tie with coloured stripes indicating the house they belong to. The houses earn house points for pupils efforts in sports matches, merit collection, attendance, punctuality and other extra-curricular competitions.

OFSTED
In its September 2017 report, the Office for Standards in Education, Children's Services and Skills rated the school as "requires improvement". Teaching, learning and pupils outcomes where all rated as "requires improvement". This assessment was unchanged from its  November 2015 report.

in January 2020 OFSTED rated the school as "Good".

In 2015 53 per cent of pupils got 5 GCSEs including English and maths. The figure for "disadvantaged students" figure was 39 per cent. The Progress 8 figure for 2016 was -0.34 which is below the national average, and the provisional progress 8 figure for 2017 is -0.3 which is again below average.

The Radcliffe School - War Memorial
The Radcliffe School was built in 1956 as a Grammar School, before becoming a Comprehensive school in 1969. During its build, the west wing of the school was planned around a central courtyard, which contained laboratories, history and geography rooms and sixth form division rooms. In the centre of the courtyard, a biology pool was installed and at one end of the pool a memorial was built. This honours former pupils who were killed in the two world wars. The bronze plaques that list the former students were transferred from the hall of the old school and added to the memorial where it still stands today.

World War 1 - Roll of Honour - Click here for more information on each name
 John Askham BILLINGHAM
 Edgar Archer BROWN
 Antliff Edward BURTON
 Richard Percy BUXTON
 Donald Paxton CAVES
 Horace Edward CRANE
 John Robert FLEET
 John Graham GILLAM
 Ronald Augustus HARRIS
 William Henry LINEHAM
 Arthur Lewis LLOYD
 Charles E MITCHELL
 Edward Osmond PARSONS
 John Montague SHAKESHAFT
 Arthur Charles VICKERY
 Francis William WEBBER
 Lawrence Bennett WRIGHT

World War 2 - Roll of Honour - Click here for more information on each name
 Vincent BARBER
 David Conquest BARKER
 Montague Victor BERRY
 Norman Stanley BIRCH
 Arthur Charles Gordon CRANE
 Herbert Arthur DIXEY
 Herbert Robert GOODWIN
 Robert Geoffrey HIGGINS
 Peter HOOTON
 Eric William INWOOD
 Noel ISHAM
 Roger JACKSON
 John William JONES
 Gerald Archibald LANGLEY
 Charles Sidney LAWMAN
 Edward John LINE
 James William MALLARD
 Peter Eric MEADOWS
 Robert John Alexander MILLS
 Francis Frederick MORRIS
 Neville Francis Nugent MORRIS
 John Cyrill NORRIS
 Charles Edward PETITT
 Ronald Wilkie John PHELPS
 George Vincent SIGWART
 Joseph Henry SMART
 Horace Wakeland SMITH
 Ronald Ernest TEBBUTT
 Richard James Henry WHEATLEY

Notable former pupils
 Dele Alli, footballer
 Steve McNeil
 Simon Munn
 Fallon Sherrock, English Professional Darts Player
 Matthew Douglas, GB 400m Hurdler

TV appearance
Pupils from the school appeared in an ITV quiz show "Chatterbox" broadcast 5 July 1977. Their opponents were The Cedars School of Bedfordshire.

References

External links
 The Radcliffe School homepage

Secondary schools in Milton Keynes
Foundation schools in Milton Keynes